Furchgott is a surname. Notable people with the surname include:

David Furchgott (born 1947), American artistic director
Robert F. Furchgott (1916–2009), American biochemist